Crescas is a Judaeo-Catalan family name, prominent in the former Crown of Aragon. Crescas is a common name among Jews of southern France and Catalonia. There have been a number of  scholars and rabbis sharing that surname, including:

 Abiathar Crescas, a 15th-century Jewish physician and astrologer, doctor to King John II of Aragon (1458–79)
 Astruc Don Crescas
 Meshullam ben Machir, Don Bonet Crescas de Lunel, French scholar who settled at Perpignan, where he died in 1306
 Hasdai Crescas (Barcelona – 1410/1411), a Catalan Jewish philosopher, halakhist
 Israel ben Joseph Halevi Crescas Caslari, known as "Crescas Caslari", an Aragonese-French Jewish physician and poet
 Mordecai En Crescas of Orange
 Don Crescas Vidal of Perpignan (fr)
 Vidal de Caslar Crescas

Cresques 
Cresques is the Catalan standardized variant of the Jewish name Crescas 
 Abraham Cresques (? – 1387), a Jewish cartographer from Palma de Mallorca
 Jehuda Cresques (also Jafudà Cresques; 1350 ? – 1427 ?)
 Cresques Abiatar , a Jewish physician in Catalan Aragon Kingdom

External links
 Cresques entry at Behind the Name

References

Catalan-language surnames
Jewish surnames
Jewish families
Spanish families
French families